Joseph Goubert (born 25 November 1908, date of death unknown) was a French field hockey player. He competed in the 1936 Summer Olympics.

Career
Goubert was a member of the French field hockey team, which finish fourth in the 1936 Olympic tournament. He played all five matches as forward.

External links
 
Joseph Goubert's profile at Sports Reference.com

1908 births
Year of death missing
French male field hockey players
Olympic field hockey players of France
Field hockey players at the 1936 Summer Olympics